Pujol is a Catalan word meaning small hill. It may refer to:

Pujol (restaurant), Mexico City, Mexico

People with the surname
Antonio Pujol (1913–1995), Mexican painter
Catherine Pujol (born 1960), French politician
Emilio Pujol (1886–1980), Spanish composer, musicologist and classical guitar teacher
Joan Pau Pujol (1570–1626), Catalan and Spanish composer
Jordi Pujol (born 1930), president of the Generalitat de Catalunya 1980–2003
Juan Pujol García (1912–1988), double agent working for the British in World War II
Laetitia Pujol (born 1975), French ballet dancer
Le Pétomane (Joseph Pujol, 1857–1945), French performer
Máximo Diego Pujol (born 1957), Argentine guitarist and composer
Marc Pujol (born 1982), Andorran footballer
Michèle Pujol (1951–1997), French-Canadian feminist, economist professor and human rights activist
Norma Pujol (born 1988), Catalan politician
Óscar Pujol (born 1983), Spanish road cyclist
Edson Leal Pujol (born 1955), Brazilian Army General and Brazilian Army Commander (2018-2021)
Òscar Pujol Riembau (born 1959), Catalan sanscritist

See also

Pujols (disambiguation)
Puyol, a surname

Catalan-language surnames
Occitan-language surnames
Surnames of Spanish origin
Surnames of French origin